The 1975-76 American Basketball Association season saw the San Diego Sails fold due to weak home attendance and other financial pressures; the team folded 11 games into the season.

Offseason

Draft picks 

 Kevin Grevey, University of Kentucky (signed with the Washington Bullets of the NBA)
 Bob Gross, California State University, Long Beach (signed with the Portland Trail Blazers of the NBA)

Preseason transactions

 June 1975: Frank Goldberg purchases the team
 June 1975: Irv Kaze named General Manager
 June 1975: Alex Groza named Director of Player Personnel
 June 28, 1974: Bill Musselman hired as head coach
 August 20, 1975: Sails purchase Mark Olberding from the San Antonio Spurs
 October 21, 1975: Sails trade a second-round draft choice and cash to the Spirits of St. Louis for Dave Robisch

Preseason exhibition games

Like most ABA teams, the Sails took the court in preseason exhibition action against the NBA.  However, unlike most ABA teams, the Sails only played one such game prior to the 1975-76 season.  The Sails began their preseason play on October 15, 1975, as they hosted the Portland Trail Blazers.  The Sails' Caldwell Jones led all scorers with 27 points and also had 27 rebounds while holding Portland's Bill Walton to 6 points and 11 rebounds, but Portland won 98-85.  Despite the Sails' loss the ABA won 31 games against the NBA in that preseason, compared to 17 wins for the NBA.

Regular season

Roster
35   Clint Chapman
8  Lee Davis
6  Tom Ingelsby
       Warren Jabali
2  Stew Johnson
3  Caldwell Jones
43  Kevin Joyce
10  Bo Lamar
15  Pat McFarland
53  Mark Olberding
11  Roscoe Pondexter
12  Dave Robisch
9  Rick Schmidt
21  Bobby Warren
22  Joby Wright

Season standings

Game log

|-
||  ||  ||  || || ||  ||
|-

|-
||  ||  ||  || || ||  ||
|-

|-
||  ||  ||  || || ||  ||
|-

|-
||  ||  ||  || || ||  ||
|-
|-

|-
||  ||  ||  || || ||  ||
|-
|-

|-

Month by Month

October 1975

The ABA opened its 1975-76 season on October 24, 1975, and on that night the Sails hosted the Denver Nuggets before 3,060 fans.  Denver's Ralph Simpson led all scorers with 30 points and Denver won 120-108.  The next night the Sails began a long road swing by earning their first win in franchise history with a road victory against the Utah Stars.  Bo Lamar led all scorers with 29 points and 5,525 fans saw the Sails prevail 99-97.  The very next night the Sails lost on the road against the Spirits of St. Louis; a meager crowd of 1,144 saw Maurice Lucas lead all scorers with 25 as the Spirits won 101-85.  On October 29 the Sails lost on the Indiana Pacers home court 105-100; Caldwell Jones, Billy Knight and Billy Keller each scored 25 before 5,007 fans.  The Sails closed the month with a close road loss to the San Antonio Spurs 102-100 as 4,147 saw James Silas lead all scorers with 29.  The Sails had only one home game in October and finished the month with a record of 1-4.

November 1975

On November 1 the Sails finally returned home, losing to the Virginia Squires 109-105 before 2,396 fans; Ticky Burden led all scorers with 45.  The next night at home the Sails defeated the San Antonio Spurs 105-102; James Silas had 28 for San Antonio to lead all scorers and attendance was only 1,670.  On November 5 the Sails returned to the road for a rematch with the Virginia Squires which the Sails won 118-104 despite Ticky Burden's 40 points for the Squires in Mack Calvin's debut as Virginia's head coach before 4,334 fans.  On November 7 the Sails faced the Kentucky Colonels in Cincinnati, Ohio; Dave Robisch scored 31 for San Diego but the Colonels won 104-99 before 11,887 fans.  The next night the Sails lost another road game, this time to the San Antonio Spurs 99-76; attendance was 7,812.  The following night in St. Louis, unbeknownst to anyone at the time, the Sails played the final game in the franchise's history.   Despite San Diego's Mark Olberding leading all scorers with 21 points the Spirits of St. Louis defeated the San Diego Sails 95-92 before 1,194 fans.

On November 12, 1975, the ABA announced that it was folding the San Diego Sails franchise.  The Sails were scheduled to host the Indiana Pacers on that day but the game was not played.

The Sails had only played three home games (out of 11) and in those games attendance dropped from 3,060 to 2,396 to 1,670. In that time owner Frank Goldberg, knowing that the ABA-NBA merger was likely at the end of the season, learned that Los Angeles Lakers owner Jack Kent Cooke would vigorously oppose the Sails' entry into the NBA, as he wanted no further competition in the southern California market (and the Cooke-owned cable television system owned the rights to Lakers' telecasts).

The Sails' roster was dispersed:

 Dave Robisch to the Indiana Pacers
 Stew Johnson to the San Antonio Spurs
 Mark Olberding to the San Antonio Spurs
 Kevin Joyce to the Kentucky Colonels
 Caldwell Jones to the Kentucky Colonels
 Coach Bill Musselman to the Virginia Squires

Player statistics

Legend

Season

Playoffs

Awards and records

Awards

Records

Transactions

Draft and preseason signings

Draft picks

 Kevin Grevey, University of Kentucky (signed with Washington Bullets of the NBA)
 Bob Gross, California State University, Long Beach (signed with Portland Trail Blazers of the NBA)

Signings

 June 28, 1974: Bill Musselman hired as head coach
 August 20, 1975: Sails purchase Mark Olberding from the San Antonio Spurs

Trades

 October 21, 1975: Sails trade a second-round draft choice and cash to the Spirits of St. Louis for Dave Robisch

Notes

References
Sails on Basketball Reference
RememberTheABA.com 1974-75 regular season and playoff results
RememberTheABA.com  San Diego Sails page

San Diego
San Diego Sails